The following are lists of the highest-grossing animated films of the 1990s.

Highest-grossing animated films of the 1990s
Figures are given in U.S. dollars (USD). Walt Disney Feature Animation is the most represented animation studio with 10 films on the list and has the highest total of any animation studio in that decade. Distributors listed are for the original theatrical release.

Highest-grossing film by year

See also
 List of highest-grossing animated films of the 1980s
 List of highest-grossing animated films of the 2000s
 List of highest-grossing animated films of the 2010s

References
  

1990s
1990s animated films
Animated
Animated
Highest-grossing
Highest-grossing animated